The 1958 Formula One season was the 12th season of Formula One motor racing. It featured the 1958 World Championship of Drivers, which commenced on 19 January 1958 and ended on 19 October after eleven races. This was the first Formula One season in which a manufacturers title was awarded, the International Cup for F1 Manufacturers being contested concurrently with the World Championship of Drivers except the Indianapolis 500 which did not count towards the Cup. Englishman Mike Hawthorn won the Drivers' title after a close battle with compatriot Stirling Moss and Vanwall won the inaugural Manufacturers award from Ferrari. Hawthorn retired from racing at the end of the season, only to die three months later after a road car accident.

The season was one of the most important and tragic seasons in Formula One's history. Four drivers died in four different races during this season. Italian Luigi Musso in his works Ferrari during the French Grand Prix at Reims; Musso's teammate, Englishman Peter Collins during the German Grand Prix at the Nürburgring, Englishman Stuart Lewis-Evans in his Vanwall at the Moroccan Grand Prix in Casablanca, and in a non-Formula One race, American Pat O'Connor at the Indianapolis 500. Hawthorn retired from motor racing after his success but was killed in a road accident only a few months later. This season was also effectively the last year of Grand Prix racing where the field was dominated by front-engined cars; this had been the case since the early 1900s when car racing was happening in informal events across Europe and the United States. The 1959 and 1960 seasons would be transitional years, where grids at Grand Prix events would feature more and more mid-engined cars and fewer front-engined cars. The mid-engined cars, with their better road holding, increased driving comfort, lighter weight, and ease on tires and mechanical components (particularly brakes), were the way to go. Even an old-fashioned traditionalist like Enzo Ferrari had to concede that mid-engined cars were what his team needed to be competitive, and Ferrari did not have a race-ready mid-engined car until 1961.

Season summary
The International Cup for F1 Manufacturers was awarded for the first time, but Ferrari's Mike Hawthorn won the Drivers' Championship from Stirling Moss, despite the latter having won four of the ten grand prix to Hawthorn's one.

Rear-engined Cooper-Climaxes, entered by the private owner Rob Walker, won two early-season races through Moss and Maurice Trintignant.

Following the Portuguese Grand Prix, Hawthorn faced a penalty, but Moss sportingly spoke up for him, and the points that Hawthorn was able to keep subsequently enabled him to edge ahead of Moss for the title.

Moss's teammate at Vanwall, Tony Brooks, also won three races. His success in the Italian race, overtaking Hawthorn after Moss had retired, ensured the title went to the final round in Morocco. Moss needed to win, with a fastest lap and Hawthorn third or lower to win the title. With Moss leading, Brooks and teammate Stuart Lewis-Evans attempted to hold Hawthorn in third. However, both their engines failed – Lewis-Evans's tragically resulting in severe burns from which he did not recover. Hawthorn finished second to win his first title by a single point. Vanwall won the inaugural Constructors' competition.

Hawthorn's death early in 1959 compounded a tragic season for Formula One, with four drivers killed or fatally injured on the track. Luigi Musso died in the French Grand Prix, Peter Collins a month later in the German Grand Prix – just two weeks after winning his home race, Lewis-Evans died in hospital following his fire in Morocco, and Pat O'Connor died at the Indianapolis 500 (which, at the time, was a round of the World Championship).

Maria Teresa de Filippis became the first woman to drive in a race counting towards the World Championship of Drivers. Reigning five-time World Champion Juan Manuel Fangio, the dominant driver of the 1950s and one of the greatest of all time, competed in only two races as a privateer, retiring after the French Grand Prix.

Season review

  The Indianapolis 500 also counted towards the 1958 USAC Championship and was run for USAC Championship cars, but did not count towards the International Cup for F1 Manufacturers.

Teams and drivers
The following teams and drivers competed in the 1958 FIA World Championship.

 The above list does not include drivers who only contested the Indianapolis 500.
 Pink background denotes Formula Two cars at the German and Moroccan Grands Prix

World Drivers' Championship standings

Points were awarded to the first five finishers at each race on an 8–6–4–3–2 basis. An additional point was awarded to the driver setting the fastest race lap. The best six results from the eleven races were retained.

 Italics indicates the fastest lap (One point awarded – point shared equally between drivers sharing fastest lap)
 Bold indicates pole position
 ~ No points awarded for shared drive
 1 – Ineligible for Formula One points, because he drove with a Formula Two car.

International Cup for F1 Manufacturers standings
The 1958 International Cup for F1 Manufacturers was contested over the same series of races as the World Championship of Drivers, except the Indianapolis 500, which counted only towards the Drivers' title. Points were awarded to the first five finishers at each race on an 8–6–4–3–2 basis. However, a manufacturer only received points for its highest-placed car, and only the best six results from the ten races were retained.

Bold results counted to championship totals.

 No points were awarded for a shared drive.

Non-championship races
The following races were contested by Formula One cars but did not count towards the World Championship of Drivers or the International Cup for Formula One Manufacturers.

References

External links
 Race results and images from the 1958 World Championship of Drivers at f1-facts.com

Formula One seasons